Michael Duffield (1915 - June 1986) was an English-born character actor who worked in Australia for many decades. He was nominated for the 1979 AACTA Award for Best Actor in a Supporting Role for his role in The Last of the Knucklemen, a role he was reprising from the original stage production. 

Duffield was also a prominent theatre actor, starting from 1950, with numerous career characters with the Melbourne Theatre Company, he won awards in 1962 for his performance on stage in The Caretaker and also was notable for playing. Winston Churchill in the production "The Soldiers". Whilst on television he appeared in numerous televised live plays.

He died in June 1986, aged 71 and was survived by a wife and three children.

Select filmography
Night of the Ding-Dong (1961)
Quiet Night (1961)
Two-Headed Eagle (1961)
Fury in Petticoats (1962)
Suspect (1962)
Fly by Night (1962)
The Music Upstairs (1962)
The White Carnation (1963)
The Prisoner (1963)
On Approval (1964)
Corruption in the Palace of Justice (1964)
Luther (1964)
A Provincial Lady (1964)
Otherwise Engaged (1964)
Macbeth (1965)
Photo Finish (1965)
Campaign for One (1965)
Cobwebs in Concrete (1968)
Two Thousand Weeks (1969)
The Cheerful Cuckold (1969)
The Last of the Knucklemen (1979)

References

External links
Michael Duffield at IMDb
Michael Duffield at Ausstage

Australian actors
1915 births
1986 deaths
British emigrants to Australia